A fish tug (sometimes called fishtug, fish tugboat, fishing tug, etc.) is a type of boat that was used for commercial fishing in the first half of the 20th century, primarily on the Great Lakes and Saint Lawrence Seaway.

History
The fish tug evolved from small, open, motorized boats which had replaced sail-powered fishing boats on the Great Lakes by the early 20th century. Fishermen soon began experimenting with enclosed cabins and net lifters, making the boats safer and more convenient on the inland seas. Most of these earlier coverings left the forward deck and stern uncovered, but by the 1930s it became common to add a pilothouse amidship or near the stern, and to continue the cabin covering to the bow in what was known as a "sprayhood."
Steel-hulled boats began to replace wooden-hulls in the late 1950s.
Beginning in the 1970s, new regulations began to greatly restrict gill-net fishing, making the fish tug all but obsolete. The few fish tugs that remain in use today are largely objects of historical preservation efforts and not under commercial ownership.

References

 
Types of fishing vessels
History of the Great Lakes